Azzurri may refer to:

Sports teams and clubs 
 Nickname for several Italian national teams:
 Italy national football team
 Italy national basketball team
 Italy national rugby league team
 Italy national rugby union team
 Italy men's national ice hockey team
 Italy men's national volleyball team
 Italy national athletics team
 Italy national alpine ski team aka Valanga azzurra (men) or Valanga rosa (women)
 S.S.C. Napoli, an Italian professional football team
 Azzurri Sports Club, home to the Adelaide Blue Eagles, an Australian football team
 Charlestown Azzurri FC an Australian football club based in Newcastle, New South Wales

Other uses
 Azzurri d'Italia classification, a points classification in the Giro d'Italia cycle race
 Azzurri Group, parent company of casual dining brand Ask Italian

See also 
 Azzurre (disambiguation)
 Azzurro (disambiguation)

 Blueshirts (Italian Nationalist Association)